Alberts Jērums (1919, Karula Parish - 1978) was a noted Latvian composer. His daughter, Jāna Jēruma-Grīnberga (a Lutheran) was consecrated a bishop in 2009; the first woman to become a bishop in UK history.

References

1919 births
1978 deaths
People from Valga Parish
Latvian composers
20th-century composers
Soviet composers